List of Guggenheim Fellowship winners for 1970.

United States and Canadian fellows 

 Patrick Ahern, professor of mathematics, University of Wisconsin–Madison.
 Michael M. Ames, former director and professor emeritus, Museum of Anthropology, University of British Columbia.
 Albert K. Ando, professor of economics and finance, University of Pennsylvania.
 Jon Howard Appleton, composer; Arthur R. Virgin Professor of Music, Dartmouth College.
 Giuseppe Attardi, professor of biology, California Institute of Technology: 1970, 1986.
 James M. Banner, Jr., independent historian, Washington, D.C..
 Thomas G. Barnes, professor of history, University of California, Berkeley.
 Samuel Haskell Baron, alumni distinguished professor emeritus of history, University of North Carolina at Chapel Hill: 1970.
 Romare Bearden, deceased. Fine arts.
 Max Beberman, deceased. Education.
 Jonathan Beckwith, American Cancer Society Research Professor of Microbiology and Molecular Genetics, Harvard Medical School.
 Charles Franklin Bennett, professor of biogeography, University of California, Los Angeles.
 Malcolm Bersohn, associate professor of chemistry, University of Toronto.
 Alexander M. Bickel, deceased. Law.
 Peter J. Bickel, chair, professor of statistics, University of California, Berkeley.
 James Bishop, artist, New York City.
 Ronald Bladen, deceased. Fine Arts.
 John McDonald Blakely, professor of materials science and engineering, Cornell University.
 Henry David Block, deceased. Computer science.
 Derk Bodde, professor emeritus of Chinese studies, University of Pennsylvania.
 Peter Boerner, emeritus professor of Germanic languages, of comparative literature, and of West European studies, Indiana University.
 Robert Earl Boles, novelist.
 Stephen Booth, professor of English, University of California, Berkeley.
 Daniel Branton, Higgins Research Professor of Biology, Harvard University.
 Oscar G. Brockett, Z. T. Scott Family Chair and Professor of Drama, University of Texas at Austin.
 Bertram Neville Brockhouse, professor of physics, McMaster University.
 Charles Jacob Brokaw, emeritus professor of biology, California Institute of Technology.
 James Broughton, deceased. Filmmaker; retired lecturer in film, College of the San Francisco Art Institute and California State University, San Francisco: 1970, 1973.
 Frederick Brown, professor of French & Italian, State University of New York at Stony Brook: 1970, 1984.
 Jan Harold Brunvand, emeritus professor of English, University of Utah.
 Alma Lyman Burlingame, professor of chemistry and pharmaceutical chemistry, University of California, San Francisco.
 Ben Caldwell, playwright, New York City. 
 David Cass, professor of economics, Carnegie Mellon University
 Richard W. Castenholz, professor of biology, University of Oregon. 
 Joseph Chaikin, Theatre Arts. Founder of The Open Theater.
 Hung Cheng, professor of applied mathematics, Massachusetts Institute of Technology.
 Dorrit Cohn, Ernest Bernbaum Professor Emeritus of Literature, Harvard University.
 Clyde Hamilton Coombs, deceased. Psychology.
 Edwin L. Cooper, professor of anatomy, School of Medicine, University of California, Los Angeles.
 James Albert Coulter, professor of classics, Columbia University.
 Dwaine O. Cowan, professor of chemistry, Johns Hopkins University.
 Jack Kenneth Crandall, professor of chemistry, Indiana University.
 William Philip Creger, emeritus professor of medicine, Stanford University School of Medicine.
 Frederick Campbell Crews, chair, professor of English, University of California, Berkeley.
 James Watson Cronin, University Professor Emeritus of Physics, University of Chicago: 1970, 1982.
 David Knight Crowne, associate professor of English and comparative literature, University of California, San Diego.
 Imogen Cunningham, deceased. Photography.
 Michael Curschmann, professor of Germanic languages and literatures, Princeton University.
 Phillip Whitcomb Damon, professor of English and comparative literature, University of California, Berkeley.
 George Dangerfield, deceased. British history.
 Robert Choate Darnton, Shelby Cullom Davis Professor of European History, Princeton University.
 William Robert Davis, professor of physics, North Carolina State University at Raleigh.
 Roderic H. Davison, deceased. Near Eastern Studies.
 Istvan Deak, Seth Low Professor of History, Columbia University. 
 Andrew P. Debicki, professor of Spanish & Portuguese literature, University of Kansas.
 Linda Dégh, distinguished professor of folklore, Indiana University.
 Paul M. de Man, deceased. Literary Criticism: 1970, 1981.
 Peter Florian Dembowski, distinguished service professor emeritus of French, University of Chicago.
 Charles A. Desoer, professor of electrical engineering and computer sciences, University of California, Berkeley.
 Robert Dorfman, professor emeritus of political economy, Harvard University.
 Rosalyn Drexler, writer, Newark, NJ.
 Robert Duran, artist, Hillsdale, New Jersey.
 Ronald M. Dworkin, professor of jurisprudence, University of Oxford.
 Paul Earls, deceased. composer; member, Center for Advanced Visual Studies, Massachusetts Institute of Technology.
 Stanley Maurice Elkins, deceased, Sydenham Clark Parsons Professor of History, Smith College.
 John Martin Ellis, emeritus professor of German literature and dean of the Graduate Division, University of California, Santa Cruz.
 Thomas Lee Eyen, deceased. Drama.
 Robert Carlyle Fahey, professor of chemistry, University of California-San Diego.
 Louis Falco, deceased. Choreography.
 Louis C. Faron, professor emeritus of anthropology, State University of New York Stony Brook.
 Benedict J. Fernandez, III, photographer; chairman, Parsons Department of Photography, The New School for Social Research.
 Leslie A. Fiedler, deceased, Samuel L. Clemens Distinguished Professor of English, State University of New York at Buffalo.
 Michael Ellis Fisher, Wilson H. Elkins Distinguished University Professor and Regents Professor, Institute for Physical Science and Technology, University of Maryland at College Park: 1970, 1978.
 Robert Worth Frank, Jr, professor emeritus of English, Pennsylvania State University; editor, Chaucer Review.
 Arthur J. Freeman, Morrison Professor of Physics, Northwestern University.
 Maurice Friedberg, head, professor of Russian literature, University of Illinois at Urbana-Champaign: 1970, 1981.
 Jonathan Abraham Gallant, professor of genetics, University of Washington.
 John Herbert Galloway, professor of geography, University of Toronto.
 Leonard Gardner, novelist, Mill Valley, California.
 Frederick R. Gehlbach, professor of biology, Baylor University.
 Howard Gest, distinguished professor emeritus of Microbiology, Indiana University: 1970, 1979.
 Ralph E. Giesey, professor emeritus of history, University of Iowa.
 Alexander N. Glazer, professor of biochemistry and molecular biology, University of California, Berkeley: 1970, 1982.
 Irving Hyman Goldberg, Otto Krayer Professor of Pharmacology, Harvard Medical School.
 Moise H. Goldstein, Jr., emeritus professor of electrical & computer engineering, The Johns Hopkins University.
 Nicholas K. Gonatas, professor of pathology and Laboratory Medicine, University of Pennsylvania School of Medicine.
 Eugene Goodheart, Edytha Macy Gross Professor of Humanities, Brandeis University.
 Eugene C. Goossen, deceased. Fine Arts Research.
 Norman S. Grabo, Chapman Professor Emeritus of English, University of Tulsa.
 Hugh Davis Graham, Holland N. McTyeire Professor of History, Vanderbilt University.
 Victor E. Graham, deceased. French literature.
 Robert S. Grosvenor, artist, East Patchogue, New York: 1970, 1983.
 Lawrence Gushee, emeritus professor of music, University of Illinois at Urbana-Champaign: 1970, 1982.
 Albert Z. Guttenberg, professor emeritus of urban and regional planning, University of Illinois at Urbana-Champaign.
 Charles Edward Haden, composer, Malibu, California.
 Anna S. Halprin, choreographer, San Francisco.
 Ann Sutherland Harris, professor of art history, University of Pittsburgh University.
 Walter Ashley Harrison, chairman, professor of applied physics, Stanford University.
 Gary H. Higgins, Earth Scientist, Alameda, California.
 Richard Grant Hiskey, Ph.D. Alumni Professor Emeritus of Chemistry, University of North Carolina at Chapel Hill.
 Chien Ho, Alumni Professor of Biological Sciences, Carnegie-Mellon University.
 Yu-Chi Ho, Gordon McKay Professor of Engineering and T. Jefferson Coolidge Professor of Applied Mathematics, Harvard University.
 Richard Hoffmann, Composer; professor of composition and music theory, Conservatory of Music, Oberlin College: 1970, 1977.
 Robert B. Hollander, professor of European literature, comparative literature, and Romance languages and literatures, Princeton University.
 Werner Konstantin Honig, professor of psychology, Dalhousie University.
 Franklin Eugene Huffman, associate professor of Southeast Asian Linguistics, Cornell University.
 Vincent Ilardi, visiting professor of history, Yale University and Emeritus Professor of History, University of Massachusetts at Amherst.
 Shinya Inoué, distinguished scientist, Woods Hole Marine Biological Laboratory.
 Aiyasami Jayaraman, senior research scientist, Institute of Geophysics, University of Hawaii at Manoa, Honolulu.
 John Trevor Jefferies, astronomer, National Optical Astronomy Observatories, Tucson, Arizona.
 Patricia Johanson, Artist, Buskirk, New York: 1970, 1980.
 Paul Austin Johnsgard, Foundation Professor of Biological Sciences, University of Nebraska-Lincoln.
 James William Johnson, professor emeritus of English, University of Rochester.
 Larry Jordan, Filmmaker; professor in Film Making, San Francisco Art Institute.
 Norton Juster, writer; professor of design, Hampshire College.
 Rudolf Emil Kálmán, Graduate Research Professor, University of Florida, Gainesville.
 Harry Kalven, Jr, deceased. Law.
 Herbert Harold Kaplan, professor emeritus of history, Indiana University.
 Isaac Raymond Kaplan, president, Global Geochemistry Corporation, Canoga Park, California.
 Edwin Kashy, professor of physics, Michigan State University.
 Robert Katz, writer, Rome.
 Edward Louis Keenan, Jr, chair, professor of history, Harvard University.
 William Kessen, Eugene Higgins Professor of Psychology and Professor of Pediatrics, Yale University.
 Leonard Kleinrock, professor of computer science, University of California, Los Angeles.
 Freda Koblick, acrylic artist and sculptor, San Francisco.
 Eila Mirjam Kokkinen, art historian, New Paltz, New York.
 Harold Hutchinson Kolb, Jr., professor of English, University of Virginia. 
 Ed Koren, artist, cartoonist
 Karl Korte, composer
 Jonathan Kozol, writer, Byfield, Massachusetts: 1970, 1984.
 Irwin Kra, distinguished Service Professor of Mathematics, State University of New York at Stony Brook.
 Isaac Kramnick, associate dean, College of Arts and Sciences, Cornell University.
 David H. Krantz, professor of psychology, Columbia University.
 Rosalind E. Krauss, art historian; Distinguished Professor of Art History, CUNY Graduate Center.
 William D. Labov, professor of linguistics, University of Pennsylvania: 1970, 1987.
 Yvonne Théry Lanni, biologist.
 Walter Laqueur, chairman, International Research Council, The Center for Strategic and International Studies, Georgetown University. 
 Gerald S. Lesser deceased, psychologist who played a major role in developing the educational programming included in Sesame Street.
 Rachmiel Levine, deceased. Biochemistry-Molecular Biology.
 Karel Frederik Liem, Henry Bryant Bigelow Professor; Curator of Ichthyology; Master of Dunster House, Harvard University: 1970, 1978.
 Leo E. Litwak, writer; professor of English and creative writing, San Francisco State University.
 Donald A. Ludwig, professor of mathematics, University of British Columbia.
 David B. Lyons, professor of law and professor of philosophy, Boston University.
 August H. Maki, emeritus professor of chemistry, University of California, Davis.
 Harvey Claflin Mansfield, Jr., William R. Kenan, Jr. Professor of Government, Harvard University.
 Gregory J. Markopoulos, deceased. Film. 
 Gary T. Marx, professor emeritus of sociology, Massachusetts Institute of Technology.
 Henry F. May, emeritus professor of scenography, University of California, Berkeley.
 Jerome J. McGann, The John Stewart Bryan University Professor of English, University of Virginia: 1970, 1975.
 John Patrick McKay, professor of history, University of Illinois at Urbana-Champaign.
 Eric Louis McKitrick, professor of history, Columbia University: 1970, 1976.
 Nathaniel David Mermin, Horace White Professor of Physics, Cornell University.
 Leonard B. Meyer, Benjamin Franklin Professor Emeritus of Music and the Humanities, University of Pennsylvania. 
 Joel Meyerowitz, photographer
 Leonard Michaels, writer; professor of English, University of California, Berkeley.
 Jacob Mincer, Joseph L. Buttenwieser Professor Emeritus of Economics, Columbia University.
 Charles Mitchell, professor emeritus, History of Art, Bryn Mawr College.
 Masao Miyoshi, Hajime Mori Professor of Japanese, English and Comparative Literature, University of California, San Diego: 1970, 1975.
 Perry B. Molinoff, vice president, Bristol-Myers Squibb, Wallingford, Connecticut.
 Robert K. Mortimer, emeritus professor of medical physics, University of California, Berkeley.
 Jurgen Moser, deceased. Mathematics.
 Leonard Muscatine, emeritus professor of biology, University of California, Los Angeles.
 Alexander Nadas, pediatric cardiologist at Boston Children's Hospital and Harvard Medical School
 June C. Nash, distinguished professor emeritus of Anthropology, City College, City University of New York.
 Robert McCorkle Netting, deceased. Anthropology.
 Gerald Nichols, Artist; chairman, professor of painting, University of the Arts, Philadelphia.
 Yvonne Noble, Scholar, Canterbury, Kent, England. Married name: Davies, Yvonne Noble.
 M. Frank Norman, professor of psychology, University of Pennsylvania.
 Simon Ottenberg, professor emeritus of anthropology, University of Washington.
 Tod Papageorge, photographer; professor of photography, Yale University: 1970, 1977.
 Carlo Pedretti, professor of art, University of California, Los Angeles.
 Noel Perrin, writer; adjunct professor of environmental, Dartmouth College: 1970, 1985.
 Irving Petlin, deceased. Artist, New York City.
 John Charles Polanyi, university professor of chemistry, University of Toronto: 1970, 1979. 
 Arthur M. Poskanzer, physical chemist, nuclear physicist
 Richard Lionel Predmore, deceased. Spanish.
 William Austin Pryor, Thomas and David Boyd Professor and director, Biodynamics Institute, Louisiana State University.
 Norman Rabkin, professor emeritus of English, University of California, Berkeley.
 Dale B. J. Randall, emeritus professor of English, Duke University.
 David Reck, Composer; professor of music, Amherst College.
 James Donald Reed, poet, Hopewell, New Jersey.
 John R. Reed, professor of English, Wayne State University: 1970, 1983.
 Nicholas Rescher, university professor of philosophy, University of Pittsburgh.
 Ronald Ribman, playwright, El Dorado Hills, California.
 John J. Richetti, A. M. Rosenthal Professor of English, University of Pennsylvania.
 James M. Robinson, Arthur Letts, Jr. Professor Emeritus of Religion and Emeritus Director, Institute for Antiquity and Christianity, Claremont Graduate School. 
 Paul Arnold Robinson, Allen D. Christensen Professor of History, Stanford University.
 William Pitt Root, poet; associate professor of English, University of Montana.
 Hugo Rossi, dean, College of Science, University of Utah.
 Robert I. Rotberg, professor of government, Harvard University.
 Dale F. Rudd, Slichter Professor Emeritus of Engineering Research, University of Wisconsin-Madison.
 Raphael Rudnik, writer, Brooklyn, New York.
 Susanne Hoeber Rudolph, professor of political Science, University of Chicago.
 Michel Rybalka, professor emeritus of French and comparative literature, Washington University.
 Shôichirô Sakai, emeritus professor of mathematics, Nihon University, Tokyo.
 Bunji Sakita, distinguished professor of physics, City College, City University of New York.
 Paul S. Sanasardo, choreographer, artistic director – Modern Dance Artists, Fly Creek, New York.
 Robert LeRoy Sani, professor of chemical engineering, University of Colorado.
 Harry N. Scheiber, professor of law; chairman, Jurispridence and Social Policy Program, University of California, Berkeley, School of Law: 1970, 1988.
 Drew Schwartz, professor emeritus of genetics, Indiana University.
 Julian Schwinger, deceased. Physics.
 Marlan Orvil Scully, Herschel Burgess Chair, and Distinguished Professor of Physics, Texas A & M University.
 Paul Siddall Seaver, professor of history, Stanford University.
 Hinrich Claassen Seeba, professor of German, University of California, Berkeley.
 Eli Enoch Sercarz, professor of immunology, University of California, Los Angeles: 1970, 1977.
 Goro Shimura, professor of mathematics, Princeton University.
 Michell J. Sienko, deceased. Chemistry.
 Allan Silver, associate professor of sociology, Columbia University.
 Theodore R. Sizer, deceased. Education.
 Robert Anthony Sklar, deceased. Professor of Cinema, New York University.
 Dwight Moody Smith, Jr., George Washington Ivey Professor of New Testament Interpretation, Duke University.
 Edward Aaron Smuckler, deceased. Medicine.
 Nicholas Sperakis, artist, New York City.
 George Robert Stark, associate director of research, Imperial Cancer Research Fund, London. 
 George Steiner, Extraordinary Fellow, Churchill College, Cambridge, England.
 Melvin Ernest Stern, distinguished research professor of oceanography, Florida State University.
 Peter S. Stevens, architect, Arlington, Massachusetts.
 John A. D. Stockdale, artist, Knoxville, Tennessee.
 Mildred Chick Strand, filmmaker; professor of film, Occidental.
 Charles C. Sweeley, professor of biochemistry, Michigan State University.
 Keith Breden Taylor, professor emeritus of gastroenterology, Stanford University School of Medicine.
 Georg Bernhard Tennyson, emeritus professor of English, University of California, Los Angeles.
 H. S. Thayer, professor of philosophy, City College, City University of New York.
 John Theios, emeritus professor of psychology, University of Wisconsin-Madison.
 William A. Tiller, professor emeritus of materials science and engineering, Stanford University
 Walasse Ting, artist, New York City.
 Anne Truitt, artist, Washington, D.C.
 Jack Tworkov, deceased. Fine arts–painting.
 Abraham L. Udovitch, Khedouri A. Zilkha Professor of Jewish Civilization in the Near East; chair, professor of near Eastern Studies, Princeton University.
 Sim Van der Ryn, professor of architecture, University of California, Berkeley.
 Marshall Waingrow, professor emeritus of English, Claremont Graduate School.
 Donald F. Wallach, professor of physiology, Tufts University.
 David Ward, chancellor, University of Wisconsin-Madison.
 Richard Alan Wasserstrom, Presidential Professor of Moral Philosophy, University of California, Santa Cruz.
 Gregorio Weber, deceased. Biochemistry.
 Johannes Weertman, professor of geophysics and Walter P. Murphy Professor of Materials Science, Northwestern University.
 Charles Weiner, professor of the History of Science and Technology, Massachusetts Institute of Technology.
 Samuel B. Weiss, deceased. Biochemistry.
 David Weiss-Halivni, professor of religion, Columbia University. Appointed as Weiss, David. Pseudonym: Halivni, David.
 Martin Lawrence Weitzman, Ernest E. Monrad Professor of Economics, Harvard University. 
 Minor White, professor of photography, MIT.
 Aaron Bernard Wildavsky, deceased: Political Science.
 Forman Arthur Williams, Presidential Chair Professor of Energy and Combustion Research, University of California-San Diego, La Jolla, California.
 Joel Roudolph Williamson, Lineberger Professor in the Humanities, University of North Carolina ar Chapel Hill.
 Christopher Wilmarth, deceased. Fine Arts: 1970, 1983.
 James Quinn Wilson, James Collins Professor of Management and Public Policy, University of California, Los Angeles.
 James R. Wiseman, professor of archaeology and department chairman, Boston University.
 Hannah Marie Wormington, deceased. Anthropology and cultural studies.
 Tai Tsun Wu, Gordon McKay Professor of Applied Physics, Harvard University.
 Henry William Wyld, Jr., professor of physics, University of Illinois at Urbana-Champaign.
 Clifton K. Yearley, professor emeritus of history, State University of New York at Buffalo.
 Jose Yglesias, deceased. General non-fiction: 1970, 1976.
 Robert Hollander, deceased. Professor of Italian literature, Princeton University.

See also
Guggenheim Fellowship

References

External links
Guggenheim Fellows for 1970

1970
1970 awards